Zeuzeropecten lecerfi is a species of moth of the family Cossidae. It is found on Madagascar.

The larvae feed on Uncaria rhynchophylla.

References

Moths described in 1958
Zeuzerinae